Mount Calais is a massive mountain,  high, at the northwest side of Schokalsky Bay in the northeast part of Alexander Island, Antarctica. It was first roughly surveyed in 1909 by the French Antarctic Expedition under Jean-Baptiste Charcot, who named it for the French city of Calais. The mountain was resurveyed in 1948 by the Falkland Islands Dependencies Survey. Mount Calais is the eighth-highest point of Alexander Island while Mount Stephenson remains the highest of all the peaks.

See also
 Rouen Mountains
 Mount Cupola
 Mount Athelstan

References
 

Mountains of Alexander Island